Phidippus whitmani is a species of jumping spider.

Description
While the male is strikingly red on top, with a black band in the frontal eye region and sometimes with white setae on the forelegs, the female is of a rather inconspicuous brown color. It is one of the species of jumping spiders which are mimics of mutillid wasps (commonly known as "velvet ants"); several species of these wasps are similar in size and coloration, and possess a very painful sting.

Distribution
Phidippus whitmani occurs in the United States and Canada.

Name
The species was named after zoologist Charles Otis Whitman.

References

External links

Photographs of P. whitmani
More photographs of P. whitman and other Phidippus species
Diagnostic drawings
BugGuide: Phidippus whitmani
Whitman's Jumping Spider photos on Jeff's Nature Pages

Salticidae
Spiders of North America
Spiders described in 1909